Team Hot Wheels is a series of animated films by Mattel Playground Productions, Titmouse for the second to fourth films and Mercury Filmworks for the first film. Based on Mattel's Hot Wheels toyline, the franchise currently consists of four features released through a multitude of distribution platforms. All were directed by Matt Danner.

The first film, The Origin of Awesome, debuted in 660 theatres through a Fathom Events screening in the United States on June 7 and 8, 2014. It was later released on home video by Universal Studios Home Entertainment and aired on Cartoon Network. The first act was distributed as a 22-minute special on Netflix on February 3, 2014. The second film, The Skills to Thrill, and the third (chronologically fourth) film, Build the Epic Race!, debuted exclusively on Netflix on August 17 and October 5, 2015, respectively. Following their broadcast of the earlier films in 22-minute multi-part formats, KidsClick debuted a fourth special, Search for the 5th Driver! on October 28, 2017.

Cast and Characters
Gage wheeler (voiced by Grant George) is the leader of Team Hot Wheels. He drives in his Twin Mill, that is until it was destroyed by the Road Pirates and currently drives the Twinduction at the end of "Build the Epic Race!". He has a constant fear of hamsters, as being revealed in "The Skills to Thrill!", and loves to go fast. Gage's catchphrase is "It always comes down to speed.", which is also his motto in "The Origin of Awesome!". He is also the son of Mr. Wheeler, who makes an appearance debut in the second film as well. His mother was also mentioned in the second film, respectively, but she didn't make an appearance in any of the films.

Brandon (voiced by Ben Diskin) is the brains of Team Hot Wheels. He drives in his Quick n' Sik, that is until it was destroyed by the Road Pirates and currently drives the Fast 4WD at the end of "Build the Epic Race!". Brandon's catchphrase is "Brandon likey!", and his Quick n' Sik has amazing in-car technology like the Vacu-Suck, and auto-pilot in "The Origin of Awesome!", a plunger, a cloning device, a power drill, and emergency crabo hands in "The Skills to Thrill!", and also super boost, spiral saws, hands, a sword, a force field, a broom, slick-proof tires, and rocket tires and also used the same plunger in "Build the Epic Race!" as well. However, the Fast 4WD also comes up with rocket tires and a tennis racket, too.

Rhett (voiced by David Lodge) is the funny guy of Team Hot Wheels. He drives in his Bone Shaker, that is until it was destroyed by the Road Pirates and currently drives the Surf Crate at the end of "Build the Epic Race!". Rhett's catchphrase is "I'm okay!", and in both "The Origin of Awesome!" and "The Skills to Thrill!", it has been revealed that he can relax his chi, and do karate. He also has a mother, who makes her only appearance in the second film, respectively.

Wyatt (voiced by Nicolas Roye) is the cool guy of Team Hot Wheels that speaks in a Southern drawl. He's the driver of his Baja Truck a.k.a. Jump Truck by Wyatt himself, that is until the Road Pirates destroyed the baja truck and currently is the driver of his Land Crusher  a.k.a. grass crusher by wyatt himself at the end of "Build the Epic Race!". Wyatt's catchphrase is "Wyatt-style, baby!", and his Baja Truck can jump on the top on one building to another. Wyatt is the only member of Team Hot Wheels to be raised by his grandmother, Gammy Gram, due to the fact that none of his parents have appeared in all of the films, nor being mentioned in them either. However, Wyatt-style is an awesome stunt that he came up with, which is that in "Build the Epic Race!", he accidentally caused some destruction to the Epic Race Press Conference, and after Wyatt quits the team, Monkey replaced him, which is actually a part of the Road Pirates' plan, that is until Wyatt rejoined the team as a member, with Monkey being the newest member at the end of the film.

Films

Reception
Writing for Common Sense Media, Renee Schonfeld praised the first film's character focus, comedy and animation and gave the film four stars out of five. Brian Costello, who reviewed the second and third films for the outlet, was far less positive, summing up both features as "nothing more than a 45-minute Hot Wheels commercial" and awarding them with a one star rating.

See also
 Hot Wheels (1969-1971)
 Heroes on Hot Wheels (1991-1992)
 Hot Wheels: World Race (2003)
 Hot Wheels: AcceleRacers (2005-2006)
 Hot Wheels Battle Force 5 (2009-2011)
 Team Hot Wheels (2014-2017)

References

External links 
 Team Hot Wheels: The Origin of Awesome! (2014)  at Internet Movie Database
 Team Hot Wheels: The Skills to Thrill (2015)  at Internet Movie Database
 Team Hot Wheels: Build the Epic Race (2015)  at Internet Movie Database

Hot Wheels
Fictional racing drivers
Direct-to-video animated films
Films based on Mattel toys
KidsClick
2010s American animated films
American auto racing films
Animated films about auto racing
Television series by Mattel Creations